Ministry of Labour and Social Security may refer to any of the following
 
 Ministry of Labour and Social Security (Greece)
 Ministry of Labour and Social Security (Jamaica)
 Ministry of Labour and Social Security (Turkey)
 Ministry of Labour and Social Security (Zambia)